Francis Willoughby, 3rd Baron Middleton (25 January 1726 – 16 December 1774), was an English nobleman, the eldest son of Francis Willoughby, 2nd Baron Middleton.

He was educated at Bury St Edmund's School, and entered Jesus College, Cambridge, in 1744. He succeeded his father in 1768, inheriting the family seat at Wollaton Park, Nottinghamshire, where he subsequently lived.

He died unmarried and was succeeded by his younger brother, Thomas Willoughby, 4th Baron Middleton.

References

1726 births
1774 deaths
Alumni of Jesus College, Cambridge
Francis 3